Cooke Glacier is a glacier about  long flowing north from the northern end of the Fletcher Peninsula. It was named by the Advisory Committee on Antarctic Names after Kirsten Cooke Healey, of the United States Geological Survey (USGS), Woods Hole, Massachusetts, a computer graphics specialist from the mid-1990s onwards for the USGS project that is compiling the Satellite Image Atlas of Glaciers and 25 Glaciological and Coastal-Change Maps of Antarctica.

See also
 List of glaciers in the Antarctic
 Glaciology

References 

 

Glaciers of Ellsworth Land